The Air Accident Investigation Bureau (AAIB) is an agency of the Ministry of Transport of the government of Malaysia, stationed in Putrajaya.

Overview
The agency was created in 2011 by the Cabinet of Malaysia under the Memorandum of the Minister of Transport No. 1002/2011. It established the agency within the Ministry of Transport as an independent investigation entity. It oversees the investigations of all air accidents and serious incidents involving Malaysian and foreign registered aircraft, as well as overseas investigations involving Malaysian registered aircraft. It also conducts research and development activities to prevent future accidents.

Future
In 2017, efforts were begun to transform the agency from one covering only aviation accidents and safety to encompass all modes of transportation in Malaysia, including maritime, rail and road. The idea for the single board started following the 2013 Genting Highlands bus crash. The current AAIB, modeled after the British Department for Transport, would be called the Malaysia Transport Safety Board (MTSB), similar to the US NTSB and Australian Transport Safety Bureau.

The proposal was first drafted in 2019, but the presentation was delayed due to the COVID-19 pandemic. A second proposal was drafted, but was deferred in 2022.

See also

 Malaysia Airlines Flight 370
 Malaysia Airlines Flight 17

References

Further reading

External links
 Air Accident Investigation Bureau

Government agencies of Malaysia
Aviation organisations based in Malaysia
Organizations investigating aviation accidents and incidents